Playerist Poetry Magazine (ISSN 2048-2515) was an annual journal of poetics and graphic arts based in London (UK). Playerist was founded in 2011 by writer, composer and publisher Martin Slidel, and ran until 2018. Its patrons were Jillian Miller FRSA and poet and actor Amy Neilson Smith.

Ethos 

Playerist featured "a range of emergent and established writers and artists" from London, the UK, and worldwide, as a platform for new work. "Names" included photographer Ellen Nolan, Ivor Novello Award winner Catherine Howe, singer Christine Collister, actor Amy McAllister and international Jazz vocalist Barb Jungr. For its second edition, actor Margaret Nolan (who further contributed artwork and verse to the project) was interviewed about her experience as model for Robert Brownjohn's Goldfinger film title sequence. The interview is often quoted in articles about Nolan, and it also concludes the New York Times obituary.

Playerist was a black and white A5 pamphlet on 100g satin paper with an annual run of 200 copies. It is on catalogue at The Saison Poetry Library, South Bank Centre (London, UK), listed as a poetry magazine. Prints were distributed at a range of city venues. As a performance collective, Playerist staged several arts and music events, usually at Covent Garden's Poetry Society, many of which were filmed for the Rockyoumentally YouTube Channel (Director: Alexander McLean). Its launch event in 2011 was at The Seven Dials Club, also in Covent Garden (London). Playerist has a five-star rating on WorldCat. It followed set themes from its inception in 2011 through to its final edition in 2018. Brighton-based (East Sussex, UK) spoken word performer Yassin Zelestine contributed commissioned works for each issue.

The 2014 edition on the theme of "Mistakes" ironically contained a typo resulting in its first run being remaindered, and followed by an amended print.

Themes

Short films 

Alexander Mclean filmed and produced a series of promotional videos of various Playerist events held at The Poetry Society's Poetry Café in Covent Garden, London (UK). An exception was "The Playerist Gathering", staged at a Victorian townhouse in North London. Two events featured art installations curated by Slidel who formerly curated a group show at Brighton's Start Gallery. The installations (for separate dates) constituted printed line drawings by graphic artists Mario Herran and Chetan Prajapati.

References

External links 
 News: Playerist – Margaret Nolan Official website (UK). 2013. 
 Playerist Comedy Night – The Poetry Society (UK). 29 May 2014.
 Playerist listing at The National Poetry Library – The National Poetry Library (UK). 2018.
 Playerist Poetry Magazine Archive – What's On London (UK). 2014.
 Playerist Poetry Magazine Blog – (UK). 2018.
 Playerist Poets Live – The Poetry Society (UK). 14 March 2014.
 Playerist Poets Live at Poetry Café – What's On London (UK). 19 February 2014.
 Playerist Poets Live at Poetry Café – What's On London (UK). 18 March 2014.
 Poetry Café: Playerist Comedy Night – Review – What's On London (UK). 21 October 2013.
 The Poetry Society: Platform 1 – The Poetry Society (UK). 8 August 2015.
 The Poetry Society: Playerist Poets Live – What's On London (UK). 14 March 2014.

Poetry anthologies